The 1997–98 UEFA Cup was won by Internazionale in an all-Italian final against Lazio. It was their third title in eight years in the competition.

It was the first instance of the UEFA Cup final being a one-game contest at a neutral stadium, having previously being decided over two legs with each team having one home game.

For first time, one nation (France) was represented by seven teams: Strasbourg, Auxerre, Bastia, Nantes, Lyon, Bordeaux and Metz.

Format
According to 1996 UEFA ranking, Spain took a slot to Germany (but this one took the place of the holders), the Netherlands took a place from Russia, while Ukraine, Czech Republic, and Hungary took a slot from Israel, FR Yugoslavia and Poland (but this one took the place of troubled Albania).

The access list was finally decreased to 102 clubs, because only the 16 best national champions excluded from the Champions League group stage entered in the UEFA Cup.

Teams
The labels in the parentheses show how each team qualified for the place of its starting round:
 TH: Title holders
 LC: League Cup winners
 Nth: League position
 IC: Intertoto Cup winners
 FP: Fair play
 CL Q2: Losers from the Champions League second qualifying round

Notes

First qualifying round

|}

First leg

Second leg

2–2 on aggregate; Dinamo Minsk won on away goals.

Hapoel Petah Tikva won 3–1 on aggregate.

Dnipro Dnipropetrovsk won 8–1 on aggregate.

Boby Brno won 7–4 on aggregate.

Apollon Limassol won 4–1 on aggregate.

Celtic won 8-0 on aggregate.

Neuchâtel Xamax won 10–1 on aggregate.

Hajduk Split won 6–1 on aggregate.

Grasshoppers won 10–1 on aggregate.

2–2 on aggregate; Viking won 5–4 on penalties.

KR Reykjavík won 4–1 on aggregate.

 Ferencváros won 6–0 on aggregate.

FK Jablonec 97 won 8–0 on aggregate.

Spartak Trnava won 4–1 on aggregate.

Odra Wodzisław won 4–2 on aggregate.

Vorskla Poltava won 5–2 on aggregate.

4–4 on aggregate; Brann won on away goals.

Dundee United won 17-0 on aggregate.

4–4 on aggregate; Gorica won on away goals.

Újpest won 9–2 on aggregate.

Second qualifying round

|}

First leg

Second leg

Hajduk Split won 5–2 on aggregate.

Anderlecht won 4–0 on aggregate.

Neuchâtel Xamax won 4–2 on aggregate.

Rotor Volgograd won 6–3 on aggregate.

Trabzonspor won 2–1 on aggregate.

Rapid Wien won 6–3 on aggregate.

Celtic won 7–5 on aggregate.

1–1 on aggregate; Ferencváros won 4–3 on penalties.

Hapoel Petah Tikva won 1–0 on aggregate.

Grasshoppers won 3–2 on aggregate.

Club Brugge won 8–3 on aggregate.

PAOK won 6–3 on aggregate.

OFI Crete won 3–1 on aggregate.

1–1 on aggregate; Örebro won on away goals.

Excelsior Mouscron won 3–0 on aggregate.

Lillestrøm won 3–0 on aggregate.

AGF Aarhus won 3–2 on aggregate.

Alania Vladikavkaz won 6–2 on aggregate.

First round

|}

First leg

Second leg

Auxerre won 2–1 on aggregate.

Anderlecht won 7–6 on aggregate.

PAOK won 2–1 on aggregate.

Udinese won 3–1 on aggregate.

Ajax won 10–2 on aggregate.

Lyon won 7–3 on aggregate.

Dinamo Tbilisi won 2–1 on aggregate.

Real Valladolid won 2–1 on aggregate.

Lazio won 6–1 on aggregate.

Strasbourg won 4–2 on aggregate.

MTK Hungária won 4–1 on aggregate.

Schalke won 5–2 on aggregate.

Bastia won 1–0 on aggregate.

Spartak Moscow won 6–1 on aggregate.
The original 2nd leg game finished 2–2 (scorers: Shirko, Alenichev – Lota 2x) on 30 September (Report), but had to be replayed because the goal posts were 8 cm short of the prescribed height.

OFI Crete won 4–2 on aggregate.

Athletic Bilbao won 4–1 on aggregate.

Aston Villa won 1–0 on aggregate.

Steaua București won 2–1 on aggregate.

Rotor Volgograd won 6–1 on aggregate.

1860 Munich won 7–1 on aggregate.

Bochum won 6–5 on aggregate.

Croatia Zagreb won 9–4 on aggregate.

Braga won 3–2 on aggregate.

Rapid Wien won 2–1 on aggregate.

Internazionale won 4–0 on aggregate.

2–2 on aggregate; Liverpool won on away goals.

Metz won 6–1 on aggregate.

2–2 on aggregate; Twente won on away goals.

Club Brugge won 4–2 on aggregate.

Atlético Madrid won 4–1 on aggregate.

AGF Aarhus won 3–2 on aggregate.

Karlsruhe won 3–2 on aggregate.

Second round

|}

First leg

Second leg

Strasbourg won 3–2 on aggregate.

Internazionale won 4–3 on aggregate.

Braga won 5–0 on aggregate.

Schalke 04 won 3–1 on aggregate.

2–2 on aggregate; Ajax won on away goals.

Bochum won 4–2 on aggregate.

Karlsruhe won 3–1 on aggregate.

Spartak Moscow won 4–1 on aggregate.

Croatia Zagreb won 2–1 on aggregate.

Atlético Madrid won 9–6 on aggregate.

3–3 on aggregate; Steaua București won on away goals.

Aston Villa won 2–1 on aggregate.

Rapid Wien won 4–2 on aggregate.

Lazio won 3–0 on aggregate.

1–1 on aggregate; Twente won on away goals.

Auxerre won 5–4 on aggregate.

Third round
The draw for the third round was held on 7 November 1997.

|}

First leg

Second leg

Internazionale won 3–2 on aggregate.

Schalke 04 won 2–0 on aggregate.

Ajax won 6–4 on aggregate.

Spartak Moscow won 1–0 on aggregate.

Atlético Madrid won 2–1 on aggregate.

Aston Villa won 3–2 on aggregate.

Lazio won 3–0 on aggregate.

Auxerre won 3–0 on aggregate.

Quarter-finals

|}

First leg

Second leg

Internazionale won 2–1 on aggregate.

Spartak Moscow won 4–1 on aggregate.

2–2 on aggregate; Atlético Madrid won on away goals.

Lazio won 3–2 on aggregate.

Semi-finals

|}

First leg

Second leg

Internazionale won 4–2 on aggregate.

Lazio won 1–0 on aggregate.

Final

Top goalscorers

See also
1997–98 UEFA Champions League
1997–98 UEFA Cup Winners' Cup
1997 UEFA Intertoto Cup

References

External links
1997–98 All matches UEFA Cup – season at UEFA website
Official Site
Results at RSSSF.com
 All scorers 1997–98 UEFA Cup according to (excluding preliminary round) according to protocols UEFA + all scorers preliminary round
1997/98 UEFA Cup - results and line-ups (archive)

 
UEFA Cup seasons
2